Sanimayo (possibly from Quechua sani purple, violet, mayu river "purple (or violet) river") is a mountain in the Vilcanota mountain range in the Andes of Peru, about  high. It is situated in the Cusco Region, Quispicanchi Province, Marcapata District. Sanimayo lies northwest of the peaks of Condoriquiña and Sacsa Ananta and east of Huila Aje.

References

Mountains of Cusco Region
Mountains of Peru